"Hero" is a 2004 single released by the Swedish heavy metal band Europe. It was released on September 20, 2004, as the second single from the band's album Start from the Dark. The song was written by vocalist Joey Tempest as a tribute to Phil Lynott, the frontman of the Irish hard rock band Thin Lizzy, and was inspired by a meeting between Tempest and Lynott.

The song's music video tells a story of aspiring young rock musicians, interspersed with clips of the band on tour. The video is a tribute to Phil Lynott.

Personnel
Joey Tempest − vocals
John Norum − guitars
John Levén − bass guitar
Mic Michaeli − keyboards
Ian Haugland − drums

References 

2004 singles
Europe (band) songs
Songs written by Joey Tempest
2004 songs